Fulcher is a surname. Notable people with the name include:
Bill Fulcher, American football player and coach
Byron Fulcher, English trombonist
Colin Fulcher, birth name of English graphic artist Barney Bubbles (1942–1983)
David Fulcher, American football player
Jonni Fulcher, Scottish snooker and pool player
Mondriel Fulcher, American football player
Rich Fulcher, American comedy performer
Russ Fulcher, American politician from Idaho

It may also refer to:
Fulcher or Fulk of Angoulême, Patriarch of Jerusalem
Fulcher of Chartres, a chronicler of the First Crusade

See also 
 Fulk
English-language surnames
Surnames from given names